Charlie Barton (1919 or 1920 – May 1972) was a Canadian sports journalist. A former columnist for Buffalo Courier-Express, he won the Elmer Ferguson Memorial Award in 1985 and is a member of the media section of the Hockey Hall of Fame. He covered the Buffalo Sabres. He died of cancer in 1972.

References

Canadian sportswriters
Elmer Ferguson Award winners
1972 deaths
Year of birth uncertain